Gian Bernardo Frugoni (Genoa, 1591 - Genoa, March 22, 1661) was the 115th Doge of the Republic of Genoa and king of Corsica.

Biography 
Frugoni was born in Genoa around 1591, his family was originally from Chiavari. He was elected Doge of Genoa in 1660, the seventieth in biennial succession and the one hundred and fifteenth in republican history. As doge he was also invested with the related biennial office of king of Corsica. His Dogate was short as he suddenly died in Genoa on March 22, 1661.

See also 

 Republic of Genoa
 Doge of Genoa

References 

17th-century Doges of Genoa
1591 births
1661 deaths